Tower Hamlets Local History Library and Archives is a facility provided by the London Borough of Tower Hamlets to enable members of the public to consult books and records in their collection. It is located at Bancroft Road Library.

The facility is located in a building which was formerly the Mile End Old Town Vestry Hall built in 1862. The building was converted into a library in 1902 with money from Andrew Carnegie.

Threat of closure in 2008
In 2008 the Library and Archives were under threat from a proposal to close the library. A community campaign was started to save the library with a meeting held on 27 September 2008 to urge Councillors not to proceed with the plans. This was addressed by Stan Newens (local historian and former MEP), Bernard Kops and Jerry White. The campaign was ultimately successful.

References

External links

Organisations based in the London Borough of Tower Hamlets
Tower Hamlets
Photo archives in the United Kingdom
Carnegie libraries in England
Grade II listed buildings in the London Borough of Tower Hamlets